SMS S14 was a V1-class torpedo boat of the Imperial German Navy.  She served with the German High Seas Fleet at the start of the First World War, and was sunk by an internal explosion on 19 February 1915.

Construction and design
In 1911, the Imperial German Navy decided to break the pattern of each year's orders of torpedo boats being a development of the previous year's designs, as it felt that they were getting too big to work for the fleet. Instead the 12 torpedo boats (six each ordered from AG Vulcan and Germaniawerft) (the V1-class) were smaller than those ordered in recent years in order to be more manoeuvrable and so work better with the fleet. This change resulted in the numbering series for torpedo boats being restarted. The 1912 programme placed orders for a flotilla of 12 torpedo boats of similar design ( to ) with Schichau-Werke. The reduction in size resulted in the ships' seaworthiness being adversely affected, however, with the 1911 and 1912 torpedo boats acquiring the disparaging nickname "Admiral Lans' cripples".

S14s armament consisted of two  SK L/30 naval guns in single mounts fore and aft, one on the Forecastle and one aft. Four single 50 cm (19.7 in) torpedo tubes were fitted, with two on the ship's beam in the gap between the forecastle and the ship's bridge which were capable of firing straight ahead, and two on the ship's centreline aft of the funnels. Up to 18 mines could be carried. The ship had a crew of 74 officers and other ranks.

Construction and service

S14, yard number 865, was launched at Schichau's shipyard in Elbing, East Prussia (now Elbląg in Poland) on 2 March 1912 and was commissioned on 1 November 1912.

First World War
S14 was a member of the 13th Half-flotilla of the 7th Torpedo boat flotilla of the German High Seas Fleet on the outbreak of war. The 7th Torpedo Boat Flotilla supported the Raid on Yarmouth on 3 November 1914 and the Raid on Scarborough, Hartlepool and Whitby on 3 December 1914. S14 was sunk on 19 February 1915 by an internal explosion on the Jade. 11 of her crew were killed. The ship was salvaged later in the year and was scrapped at Wilhelmshaven.

Notes

References

Bibliography

 

 
 

Torpedo boats of the Imperial German Navy
1912 ships
World War I torpedo boats of Germany
V1-class destroyers
Ships built in Elbing
Ships built by Schichau